Jay Leach may refer to:

 Jay Leach (hockey coach) (born 1951), assistant coach for several NHL hockey teams and uncle to the other Jay Leach
 Jay Leach (ice hockey) (born 1979), AHL and NHL hockey player and coach and nephew of the other Jay Leach